Ndlovu is a surname, common in South Africa and Zimbabwe. Notable people with the surname include:

Adam Ndlovu (1970–2012), Zimbabwean footballer
Ainsley Ndlovu (born 1996), Zimbabwean cricketer
Bandisa Ndlovu (born 1996), South African rugby union player
Bekithemba Ndlovu (born 1976)
Callistus Ndlovu (1936–2019), Zimbabwean politician
Dino Ndlovu (born 1990), South African footballer
Dudu Mntowaziwayo Ndlovu (1957–1992), known as Dudu Zulu, South African dancer, percussionist, and singer
Duma Ndlovu (born 1954), South African filmmaker, playwright, and poet
Gerald Ndlovu (born 1984), Zimbabwean footballer
Gerard Sithunywa Ndlovu (1939–2013), South African Roman Catholic bishop
Hastings Ndlovu, (1961–1976), black South African schoolboy who died in the Soweto uprising against the apartheid system
Hungani Ndlovu (born 1994), South African actor and dancer
King Ndlovu (born 1993), South African footballer
Lindela Ndlovu (1953–2015), Zimbabwean academic
Lindiwe Ndlovu (1977–2021), South African actress
Louis Ncamiso Ndlovu (1945–2012), Swazi Roman Catholic bishop
Madinda Ndlovu (born 1965), Zimbabwean footballer and manager
Mandla Ndlovu, South African politician
Mangaliso Ndlovu (born 1980), Zimbabwean politician
Masotsha Ndlovu (1890–1982), Southern Rhodesian labour union leader
Methembe Ndlovu (born 1976), Zimbabwean footballer
Moses Ndlovu (born 1956/57), Zimbabwean politician
Naison Ndlovu (1930–2017), Zimbabwean politician and deputy president of the Senate
Njabulo Ndlovu (born 1994), Swazi footballer
Nokuthula Ndlovu (born 1983), Zimbabwean footballer
Ntombiyelanga Ndlovu, Zimbabwean footballer
Peter Ndlovu (born 1973), Zimbabwean footballer and manager
Robert Ndlovu (born 1955) Zimbabwean Roman Catholic priest and current archbishop of Harare
Rosemary Ndlovu (born 1978), South African serial killer
Sandile Ndlovu (born 1980), South African footballer
Sasko Ndlovu, South African rugby union player
Sikhanyiso Ndlovu (1937–2015), Zimbabwean politician
Siphesihle Ndlovu (born 1996), South African footballer
Siphiwe Gloria Ndlovu (born 1977), Zimbabwean novelist and filmmaker
Sipho Ndlovu (born 1994), Zimbabwean footballer
Sipho 'Brickz' Ndlovu (born 1981), South African musician
Sizwe Ndlovu (born 1980), South African rower
Stephanie Ndlovu Sandows (born 1990), South African actress and television presenter
Takalani Ndlovu (born 1978), South African boxer
Thandi Ndlovu (1953/54–2019), South African physician and businesswoman
Themba Ndlovu (born 1984), Zimbabwean footballer
Ursula Ndlovu (born 1994), Zimbabwean netball player
Yichida Ndlovu, first Zambian female pilot
Sabelo J. Ndlovu-Gatsheni (born 1968), Zimbabwean academic
Stephen Khehla Ndlovu (born 1965), South African Administrator

See also
Ndlovu v Ngcobo, 2002 case in South African property law
S v Ndlovu, 2005 South African legal case

Zimbabwean surnames
Bantu-language surnames